Monophyllaea is a genus of plants in the family Gesneriaceae. It contains the following species (but this list may be incomplete):

 Monophyllaea albicalyx (A. Weber)
 Monophyllaea andersonii (B.L.Burtt)
 Monophyllaea anthocrena (B.L.Burtt)
 Monophyllaea brevipes (S.Moore)
 Monophyllaea burttiana (R. Kiew)
 Monophyllaea caulescens (B.L. Burtt)
 Monophyllaea chinii (B.L.Burtt)
 Monophyllaea cupiflora (B.L. Burtt +)
 Monophyllaea elongata (B.L.Burtt)
 Monophyllaea eymae (B.L.Burtt)
 Monophyllaea fissilis (B.L.Burtt)
 Monophyllaea furcipila (Ohwi)
 Monophyllaea glabra (Ridley)
 Monophyllaea glandulosa (B.L.Burtt)
 Monophyllaea glauca (C.B. Clarke +)
 Monophyllaea hendersonii (B. L. Burtt) A. Weber
 Monophyllaea hirtella (Miq.)
 Monophyllaea hirticalyx (Franch. +)
 Monophyllaea horsfieldii (R. Brown)
 Monophyllaea hottae (B.L.Burtt)
 Monophyllaea insignis (B.L. Burtt +)
 Monophyllaea kostermansii (B.L.Burtt)
 Monophyllaea leuserensis (B.L.Burtt)
 Monophyllaea longipes (Kraenzl.)
 Monophyllaea merrilliana (Kraenzl.)
 Monophyllaea musangensis (A. Weber)
 Monophyllaea papuana (Lauterb.)
 Monophyllaea pendula (B.L.Burtt)
 Monophyllaea ramosa (B.L.Burtt)
 Monophyllaea sarangica (B.L.Burtt)
 Monophyllaea selaborensis (B.L.Burtt)
 Monophyllaea singularis (Balf. f. & W.W. Sm.) B.L. Burtt +
 Monophyllaea stellata (B.L.Burtt)
 Monophyllaea tenuis (B.L.Burtt)
 Monophyllaea tetrasepala (B.L. Burtt)
 Monophyllaea wildeana (B.L. Burtt)

References 

 
Gesneriaceae genera